Bevel is a surname. Notable people with the surname include:

James Bevel (1936–2008), American Christian minister and Civil Rights leader
Ken Bevel (born 1968), American Marine Corps officer, pastor, and actor